Costache Leancă (1893, Cuhneşti - April 18, 1942, Suhobezvodnaia) was a Bessarabian politician.

Biography 

He served as president of the general assembly of Bălți County (1917-1918).

Gallery

Bibliography  
Gheorghe E. Cojocaru, Sfatul Țării: itinerar, Civitas, Chişinău, 1998,  
Mihai Taşcă, Sfatul Țării şi actualele autorităţi locale, "Timpul de dimineaţă", no. 114 (849), June 27, 2008 (page 16)

External links  
 Costache Leancă, patriot român din Bălţi 
 Arhiva pentru Sfatul Tarii 
 Deputaţii Sfatului Ţării şi Lavrenti Beria

Notes

1893 births
1942 deaths